The Banpo Museum is a museum in Xi'an, Shaanxi, China. The museum houses artifacts from the archaeological site of Banpo. The museum gives access to the excavated buildings, has a collection of artifacts from the site, and also has several reconstructed houses designed to resemble the Neolithic settlement.

Buses run there from the Terracotta Army and from Xi'an.

See also
 List of museums in China

External links
 Xi'an Banpo Museum Official website

Archaeological museums in China
Museums in Xi'an
National first-grade museums of China